Events in the year 1994 in Greece.

Incumbents
 President – Konstantinos Karamanlis
 Prime Minister – Andreas Papandreou

Births

 29 January – Marianthi Zafeiriou, rhythmic gymnast
 29 December – Varvara Filiou, rhythmic gymnast

References

 
Years of the 20th century in Greece
Greece
1990s in Greece
Greece